Belair (formerly:"Neumerl") is a quarter in western Luxembourg City, in southern Luxembourg. 

Since 1931, Belair has been the location of Luxembourg's national stadium, rebuilt in 1990, the Stade Josy Barthel, named after Luxembourg's only Olympic gold medal winner. In 2014, the Luxembourg government announced the construction of a new national stadium in Gasperich to replace the aging structure.

Luxembourg City's main fire station and the Centre Hospitalier de Luxembourg hospital are based within Belair.

, Belair has a population of 11,703 inhabitants.

References

Quarters of Luxembourg City